This is a list of Afghanistan Test cricketers. Afghanistan were granted full membership and therefore Test status at the International Cricket Council's annual conference held on 22 June 2017, after a monumental rise through the associate ranks. A Test match is an international cricket match between two representative teams that are full members of the ICC. Both teams have two innings, and the match lasts up to five days. Afghanistan played their first Test match in June 2018 against India at the M. Chinnaswamy Stadium in Bengaluru.

The list is arranged in the order in which each player won his first Test cap. Where more than one player won his first Test cap in the same match, those players are listed alphabetically by surname.

Key

Players

Statistics are correct as of 14 March 2021.

See also 
 Test cricket
 Afghanistan national cricket team
 List of Afghanistan ODI cricketers
 List of Afghanistan T20I cricketers

References 

Afghanistan